HUU may refer to:

 Alférez FAP David Figueroa Fernandini Airport, serving Huánuco, Peru
 Hull University Union, at the University of Hull, in England
 Murui Huitoto language, spoken in Peru